Louis Joseph Kirn (June 8, 1908 – November 17, 1995), nicknamed Bullet Lou Kirn, was a rear admiral in the United States Navy.

Biography
Kirn was born on June 8, 1908 in Milwaukee, Wisconsin. He died on November 7, 1995.

Career
Kirn graduated from the United States Naval Academy in 1932 and became an aviator. During World War II he served in the Solomon Islands campaign, including the Battle of Edson's Ridge, during which time he was awarded the Navy Cross and the Distinguished Flying Cross. Later in his career he was awarded the Navy Distinguished Service Medal for his service as United States Naval Attaché and United States Naval Attaché for Air at the U.S. Embassy, London.

References

Military personnel from Milwaukee
United States Navy rear admirals
United States Naval Aviators
Recipients of the Navy Cross (United States)
Recipients of the Navy Distinguished Service Medal
Recipients of the Distinguished Flying Cross (United States)
United States Navy pilots of World War II
United States Naval Academy alumni
1995 deaths
1908 births